The Gill Deacon Show was a Canadian talk show which aired on CBC Television between October 30, 2006 and May 30, 2007. Hosted by Gill Deacon, the show featured segments on crafts, cooking and inspirational stories. It was cancelled after just one season, due to low ratings.

The show was succeeded as CBC Television's main daytime talkshow by Steven and Chris, which debuted in early 2008.

External links 
 CBC.ca - Gill Deacon show cancelled
 
 Gillian Deacon's green tips blog

2000s Canadian television talk shows
2006 Canadian television series debuts
2007 Canadian television series endings
CBC Television original programming
Television shows filmed in Toronto